Edosa xystidophora is a species of moth of the  family Tineidae. It is found in Australia in Queensland and New South Wales.

The wingspan is about 20 mm. The forewings are yellow with a dark brown base and a broad iridescent brown margin. The hindwings are plain brown.

References

Moths described in 1893
Perissomasticinae
Moths of Australia
Endemic fauna of Australia
Taxa named by Edward Meyrick